Piney Branch Road is a light rail station that is currently under construction. It will be part of the Purple Line in Maryland. The station will be located at the intersection of Piney Branch Road and University Boulevard.

History 
The Purple Line system is under construction as of 2022 and is scheduled to open in 2026.

Station layout
The station consists of an island platform on the median of University Boulevard just east of Piney Branch Road.

References

Purple Line (Maryland)
Railway stations scheduled to open in 2026
Railway stations in Montgomery County, Maryland
Silver Spring, Maryland (CDP)